This is a list of all modern cruisers built by Italy, starting from the 1880s.

Protected cruisers

  (1883) - Sold 1920
 
  (1885) - Sold 1921
  (1886) - Sold 1911
  (1886) - Sold 1907
  (1888) - Sold 1909
  (1885) - Sold to Uruguay 1908 and renamed Montevideo, BU 1932
  (1888) - Sold 1920
 
  (1891) - Sold to Haiti 1911 and renamed Consul Gostrück, BU 1913
  (1890) - Sold 1920
  (1891) - Sank 1918
  (1893) - Sold 1921
  (1893) - Transformed to seaplane tender 1915, Stricken 1921, Sold 1923
  (1898) - Stricken 1923, front of ship preserved at Gardone
  (1894) - Stricken 1924
  (1912) - Built for the Ottoman Empire as Drama. Seized by Italy 1911, BU 1937
  (1911) - Sold 1938, BU after 1939
 
  (1911) - Stricken 1929, BU
  (1912) - Stricken 1927, BU
 
  (1914) - Sank after explosion in 1919, Refloated 1920, BU 1921
  (1914) - Stricken 1937

Torpedo cruisers

 (1876)
 (1886)
 
 (1888)
 (1889)
 (1889)
 (1890)
 

 

 
 
  (1899) - Stricken 1923
  (1899) - Stricken 1920, BU

Scout cruisers
 Aquila-class
 Aquila
 Sparviero
 Nibbio
 Falco

Light cruisers
 Taranto (1911, ex-German Strassburg) - scuttled 1943, sunk 1943 & 1944, BU 1946 or later
 Bari (1914, ex-German Pillau) - Sunk 1943, BU 1948
 Brindisi (ex-Austrian ) - Stricken 1937, BU
 Venezia (ex-Austrian ) - Stricken 1937, BU
 Ancona (ex-German Graudenz) - Stricken 1937, BU

 
  (1930) - Sunk 1941
  (1930) - Sunk 1941
  (1930) - Sunk 1940
  (1930) - Sunk 1942
 
  (1931) - BU 1950s
  (1932) - Sunk 1941
 
  (1934) - BU 1960s
  (1934) - Sunk 1942
 
  (1934) - Transferred to Soviet Union 1949, renamed first Stalingrad, than Kerch
  (1935) - Transferred to Greece 1951, renamed Elli
 
  (1936) - BU 1961 or later
  (1936) - BU 1970s

  (Only those units marked * were completed)
 Attilio Regolo* (1940) - Sold to France 1948 and renamed Chateaurenault
 Scipione Africano* (1941) - Sold to France 1948 and renamed Guichen
 Pompeo Magno* (1941) -  Renamed San Giorgio, rebuilt as large destroyer 1951-55, BU 1980
 Ulpio Traiano (1942) - Torpedoed 1943
 Ottaviano Augusto (1942) - Sunk 1943
 Cornelio Silla (1941) - Sunk 1944
 Claudio Druso (-) - BU
 Caio Mario (1941) - Scuttled 1943/44
 Paolo Emilio (-) - BU
 Vipsania Agrippa (-) - BU
 Giulio Germanico (1941) - Renamed San Marco, rebuilt as large destroyer 1951-55, BU 1971/80
 Claudio Tiberio (-)
  (not completed)
 Etna (1942) - Scuttled 1943, Refloated, BU postwar
 Vesuvio (1941) - Scuttled 1943, Refloated, BU postwar
 Cattaro (ex-Yugoslav Dalmacija, captured 1941, ex-German Niobe, purchased 1924) - Torpedoed 1943
 FR 11 (ex-French Jean de Vienne, captured 1943) - Captured by Germany 1943, sunk 1944
 FR 12 (ex-French La Galissonniere, captured 1943) - Captured by Germany 1943, sunk 1944

Armored cruisers
  (1892) - Sold for BU 1922
 
  (1895) - Stricken 1920
  (1896) - Stricken 1920
 
 Giuseppe Garibaldi (1895) - To Argentina as General Garibaldi, BU 1935
 Varese (1896) - To Argentina as General San Martin, BU 1935
 Varese (1897) - To Argentina as General Belgrano, BU 1948
 Giuseppe Garibaldi (c. 1896) - To Spain as  1897, sunk at the Battle of Santiago de Cuba, 1898
 Giuseppe Garibaldi (1897) - To Argentina as General Pueyrredon, removed 1954
  (1899)
  (1899)
  (1902)

 
  (1907) - Sold 1937
  (1908) - Torpedoed 1915
 
  (1908) - Scuttled 1941
  (1908) - Captured by Germany 1943, sunk c. 1944

Heavy cruisers

 
  (1927) - Sunk 1942
  (1926) - Sunk 1943
 
  (1930) - Sunk 1941
  (1931) - Sunk 1941
  (1930) - Sunk 1941
  (1930) - Sunk 1944
  (1932) - Sunk 1944

Helicopter cruisers
 
  in commission from 1964 - 1992
  in commission from 1964 - 1989
 
  (1969) - BU 2006

See also
 List of battleships of Italy

External links
 Incrociatori Marina Militare website 

Italy
Cruisers of Italy
Cruisers